Quluaq School in Clyde River, Nunavut, is a full school from kindergarten through grade 12.  It serves a community of 1100 people and a school under the Qikiqtani School Operations.

References

External links
Quluaq School

Elementary schools in Nunavut
High schools in Nunavut
Educational institutions in Canada with year of establishment missing